The Lys was a First Rank ship of the line of the French Royal Navy, the second vessel in the two-ship Sceptre Class (her sister being the Sceptre).

This ship was ordered in April 1691 to be built at Toulon Dockyard, and on 13 May she was allotted the name Lys. The designer and builder of both ships was François Coulomb. They were three-decker ships without forecastles. The Lys was launched on 17 December 1691 and completed in February of the next year.

She was initially armed with 84 guns, comprising twenty-six 36-pounders on the lower deck, twenty-eight 18-pounders on the middle deck, twenty-four 8-pounders on the upper deck, and six 4-pounders on the quarterdeck. The 4-pounders were replaced by six 6-pounders by 1699; a thirteenth pair of 8-pounders (on the upper deck) and a fourth pair of 6-pounders (on the quarterdeck) were added in 1704, raising her to 88 guns.

References

Nomenclature des Vaisseaux du Roi-Soleil de 1661 a 1715. Alain Demerliac (Editions Omega, Nice – various dates).
The Sun King's Vessels (2015) - Jean-Claude Lemineur; English translation by François Fougerat. Editions ANCRE.  
Winfield, Rif and Roberts, Stephen (2017) French Warships in the Age of Sail 1626-1786: Design, Construction, Careers and Fates. Seaforth Publishing. . 

Ships of the line of the French Navy
1690s ships